Polysiphonia fibrillosa (Dillwyn) Sprengel is a species of marine red alga in the Rhodophyta.

Description
Polysiphonia fibrillose is a fine red alga which grows to 25 cm long. The erect cylindrical branches are themselves branched and are attached by a discoid holdfast. The branches consist of a central axis of cells each surrounded by 4 (or 5) pericentral cells of equal length and all elongate and of the same length. Corticating filaments grow down in the grooves between the pericentral cells. Rhizoids grow from the pericentral cells. Trichoblasts are numerous.
Other similar species include: P. rhunensis Thuret et Bornet, P.orthocarpa Rosenvinge. P.sertularioides and P.sanguinea C.Agardh.

Reproduction
The plants are dioecious and bear spermatangia near the apices of the branches. Cystocarps are ovoid or globular and tetrasporangia are formed in series near the apices.

Habitat
Common on rocky shores both in the littoral to the sublittoral 10 m or more. Also grows epiphytically,

Distribution
The species is widespread around Great Britain, including Shetland, and Ireland. In Europe it is recorded from Norway, the Baltic and France.

References

Rhodomelaceae